Cestyll Garden is a secluded garden with picturesque sea views near Cemaes on the north west coast of the island of Anglesey in North Wales, United Kingdom. The garden is listed as Grade II on the Cadw/ICOMOS Register of Parks and Gardens of Special Historic Interest in Wales.

History
It was once home to the Hon. Violet Vivian, who began transforming the rugged landscape into a fine garden in 1922.

Attractions
With an interesting range of plants, the garden is at its best in late May. Here you will see, among others, white rhododendrons, Japanese Maple, yellow Witch Hazel and Azaleas. The garden is open to the general public during the Spring Bank Holiday, and may be visited by special arrangement by contacting the present owners at the nearby Wylfa Nuclear Power Station.

See also

List of gardens in Wales

References

External links
Cestyll Garden

Gardens in Wales
Registered historic parks and gardens in Anglesey
Tourist attractions in Anglesey
Mechell, Anglesey
1922 establishments in Wales